Trianoptiles is a genus of flowering plants belonging to the family Cyperaceae.

Its native range is South African Republic.

Species:
 Trianoptiles capensis (Steud.) Harv. 
 Trianoptiles solitaria (C.B.Clarke) Levyns 
 Trianoptiles stipitata Levyns

References

Cyperaceae
Cyperaceae genera